Madras is the soundtrack album of the 2014 Tamil drama film of the same name written and directed by Pa. Ranjith and produced by Studio Green. Santhosh Narayanan composed the soundtrack album and background score for the film. The album consists of seven tracks with five songs and two themes. While Gana Bala penned the lyrics for the two songs sung by him, the remaining three were penned by Kabilan and Umadevi. The soundtrack album was released on 27 June 2014.

Release 
Santhosh Narayanan composed the soundtrack and background score. He elaborated that the re-recording of the songs and the background music would be a major highlight in the film, going on to say that "Kakidha Kappal" and "Aagayam Theepidicha" would surely win the hearts of listeners. The "Suvar theme" and the "Kaali Love theme" were performed by The Studio Orchestra of Sydney featuring Pradeep Kumar on the acoustic guitar. It was confirmed by sources that Karthi wouldn't be singing in the film like his previous outing, Biriyani (2013) and that Shakthisree Gopalan had recorded a melody track in the album. The soundtrack album and its marketing rights were purchased by Think Music. The film's soundtrack was released at Taj Coromandel, Chennai on 27 June 2014. Suriya, Sivakumar and the film's cast and crew attended the audio launch event. Gana Bala performed on stage during the audio launch.

Reception 
The soundtrack album received positive reviews from critics. The Times of India gave a review stating "When you have a title like Madras, most often you would see the album packed with kuthu numbers. However, Santhosh Narayanan scores a likeable album that not just keeps in line with the theme, but also manages to give a mix of everything" and gave a rating of 3 out of 5 stars for the album. S R Ashok Kumar of The Hindu labelled "Madras", "Irandhidava" and "Kakidha Kappal" to be hits among the masses, further labelling the song "Naan Nee" as "interesting" and the theme music's as "pleasant to the ear". Behindwoods wrote, "Santhosh Naraynan keeps Madras raw, fresh and unique from his other efforts" and rated the album 3.25 out of 5. Milliblog called it a "Typically likeable and exotic Santhosh concoction". Vipin of Music Aloud gave 8 out of 10 stars and concluded, "Santhosh Narayanan makes it three on three this year with Madras!" but cited that the "increasing incidence of repetitive sounds" was a little concerning. Indiaglitz gave a positive review saying that "Santhosh Narayanan has proved that he can do any genre with at most ease. Given his success, he might lead the Tamil music in the years to come."

Track listing

References 

2014 soundtrack albums
Tamil film soundtracks
Santhosh Narayanan soundtracks